William of Koppenbach (died 1374) was bishop of Pécs in the Kingdom of Hungary from 1361 to his death in 1374. He served as the first Chancellor of the University of Pécs which founded by Louis I of Hungary and Pope Urban V in 1367.

References

  Koszta, László (2009). Koppenbachi Vilmos (1361–1374). In: A Pécsi Egyházmegye története I: A középkor évszázadai (1009–1543) (Szerkesztette: Fedeles Tamás, Sarbak Gábor, Sümegi József) ("A History of the Diocese of Pécs, Volume I: Medieval Centuries, 1009–1543; Edited by Tamás Fedeles, Gábor Sarbak and József Sümegi"); Fény Kft.; Pécs; .
  ed. Romváry, Ferenc (2010). Pécs Lexikon  I. (A–M). Pécs Lexikon Kulturális Nonprofit Kft. 2010, Pécs.
 Hungarian Catholic Lexicon

1374 deaths
14th-century Hungarian people
14th-century Roman Catholic bishops in Hungary
Bishops of Pécs
Year of birth unknown